Neil Anthony Morris (born 3 May 1970) is an English former professional footballer who played as a striker in the Football League for York City and Doncaster Rovers, and in [dddd Worksop Town.

References

1970 births
Living people
Footballers from Sheffield
English footballers
Association football forwards
Doncaster Rovers F.C. players
York City F.C. players
Worksop Town F.C. players
English Football League players